ANAF may refer to:
 National Agency for Fiscal Administration, a Romanian government agency
 Army, Navy and Air Force Veterans in Canada